Evan James Williams FRS (8 June 1903 – 29 September 1945) was a Welsh experimental physicist who worked in a number of fields with some of the most notable physicists of his day, including Patrick Blackett, Lawrence Bragg, Ernest Rutherford and Niels Bohr.

Williams earned a degree at Swansea University, doctorates at Manchester and Cambridge universities and a professorship at Aberystwyth University. He was highly regarded by his colleagues, and made a Fellow of the Royal Society in 1939.

He died of cancer at the age of 42.

Early life
Williams was born in the Ceredigion village of Cwmsychbant to stonemason James and Elizabeth (née Lloyd) Williams. He attended Llanwenog Primary School, then Llandysul School, where he was a close friend of Evan Tom Davies and, like Davies, excelled in mathematics. From there Williams, at the age of 16, won a £55 scholarship to Swansea University where he studied physics and attained a first-class honours degree in 1923.

Character
Williams was stocky and strong, with blue eyes, brown hair and a broad grin; he was gregarious, passionate about cricket, and enjoyed practical jokes.

Career
From Swansea, Williams went into physics research at Manchester University's physics laboratories under Lawrence Bragg. At Manchester he attained a doctorate in physics in 1926 for his work with Bragg, studying X-rays in gases, then a second degree at the Cavendish Laboratory in Cambridge under Ernest Rutherford. In 1930 he obtained a University of Wales D.Sc.

Much of Williams's work was on sub-atomic particles, and in 1933 he spent a year working with Niels Bohr in Copenhagen where (Blackett considered) he did his best work. Throughout the 1930s he worked on developing theories further, and lectured in physics at Manchester and Liverpool, where he worked with James Chadwick.

In 1934 and 1935 he collaborated with  W.L. Bragg on a theory of the effect of thermal agitation on the atomic arrangement in alloys. The resulting mean-field theory is called the Bragg-Williams approximation and is useful for solving many problems in statistical physics.

In 1938 Williams was appointed Chair of Physics at the University College of Wales in Aberystwyth and continued his experiments with sub-atomic particles using a cloud chamber. He was elected a Fellow of the Royal Society in March 1939. Williams was the first person who experimentally detected muon decay and managed to photograph it.

Early on in World War 2 Blackett asked Williams to join RAE Farnborough to apply his imaginative physical mind to the problem of the U-boat menace. One of the results was the MDS (magnetic detection of submarines) system which was taken up with enthusiasm by US scientists when presented to them by Sir Henry Tizard in 1940. In 1941 Williams joined Blackett at the newly formed Operational Research Section at the Admiralty's Coastal Command where he worked for several more years devising more effective methods of dealing with German submarines.

Williams was diagnosed with cancer in 1944 and, despite two operations, he was able to visit Washington in 1945 in connection with the continuing war in the Far East, and also write a scientific paper as a tribute to Niels Bohr on his sixtieth birthday.

Death
Williams died in September 1945 at his parents' home in Brynawel, Carmarthenshire, at the age of 42. He was buried at Capel y Cwm, Cwmsychbant.

His obituary for the Royal Society was written by Blackett, who also broadcast a radio appreciation of Williams in 1949, in which he said: 

In 1971 John Tysul Jones published a collection of articles about Williams.

References

External links
 

Academics of the Victoria University of Manchester
Fellows of the Royal Society
Welsh scientists
Experimental physicists
1903 births
1945 deaths
20th-century Welsh scientists
Deaths from cancer in Wales